Killing on Adrenaline is the second album by American technical death metal band Dying Fetus. The technical guitar riffs began on this release, a trait that evolved and progressed even more on later albums. The album was released by Morbid Records of Germany in 1998 as a one-album deal. By 2000, they had signed to Relapse Records, who have a long tradition in underground death metal and grind.

"Kill Your Mother/Rape Your Dog" was a deceptively-titled joke-song, about the band's standpoint on mainstream music.

The album was re-released by Night Of The Vinyl Dead, on red, white and blue splatter vinyl, limited to 500 copies, in 2007.

It was re-issued in 2011 with bonus tracks by Relapse Records.

Track listing

Personnel
John Gallagher - guitars/vocals 
Jason Netherton - bass guitar/vocals 
Brian Latta - guitars 
Kevin Talley - drums

References

Dying Fetus albums
1998 albums
Relapse Records albums
Season of Mist albums